Tasmeem  is a set of Arabic enhancements for Adobe InDesign ME, developed by WinSoft International and DecoType. Tasmeem allows users to create typographically advanced text in Arabic in the Middle Eastern and North African versions of InDesign, turning it into a typesetting and design tool for Arabic.

Arabic calligraphy with Tasmeem

 
Tasmeem integrates Arabic traditional calligraphy with modern typefaces.

Subset of Tasmeem features

Tasmeem fonts
Tasmeem 4 proposes a new collection of fonts such as Naskh, Emiri, Hasan Hiba. Tasmeem fonts may only be used with Tasmeem.

Word Shaping
Word Shaping presents all the possible calligraphic alternatives for the selected letters of a word.

Text Shaping
Text Shaping deals with the same calligraphic parameters as the Word Shaping, but automates it for large amounts of text. Distribution of shape alternates, dissimilation of the same letter through a variation, Kashida distribution and frequency can be precisely controlled and applied on long text, just like a regular paragraph style.

The Position Tuner
The Position Tuner feature allows dragging and positioning a segment of a word with the mouse in normal, searchable text. It adjusts spacing, kerning and creates calligraphic arrangements. Moreover it can select and colour vowels independently.

Selection Helper
This feature facilitates the selection in non-linear text by pinpointing each letter and vowel.

Arabic Spacing
Arabic Spacing allows adjusting space between words and space between word segments.

References

External links
 More information about Tasmeem
 The WinSoft Arabic Typography Contest

Typesetting software